Harry Houdini (1874–1926) was a famous magician and escape artist.

Houdini may also refer to:

People
Bess Houdini (1876–1943), Harry Houdini's stage assistant and wife
Wilmoth Houdini (1895–1973), calypso musician
Houdini (rapper) (1998–2020)

Film and television
Houdini (1953 film), a 1953 biographical film about Harry Houdini
The Great Houdini (film), a 1976 biographical telefilm about Harry Houdini
Houdini (1998 film), a 1998 biographical telefilm about Harry Houdini
Houdini (miniseries), a 2014 television miniseries about Harry Houdini

Music
Whodini, an American hip hop trio

Albums
Houdini (album), a 1993 sludge metal album by The Melvins

Songs

"Harry Houdini" (song), a 1988 song by Canadian band Kon Kan
"Houdini" (Foster the People song), a song by Foster the People from the 2011 album Torches
"Houdini" (KSI song), a 2020 song by KSI featuring Swarmz and Tion Wayne
"Houdini" (Walter Brennan song), a song by Walter Brennan from his 1962 album Mama Sang a Song
"Houdini", a song by Kate Bush from the 1982 album The Dreaming
"Houdini", a song by Death Grips from the album Bottomless Pit

Other uses
Houdini (sailboat), a New Zealand sailboat design
Houdini (software), a high-end 3D animation package
Houdini (chess), a chess engine for Windows
Houdini (Meerkat Manor), one of the meerkats in the documentary series Meerkat Manor
Houdini (play), a 2014 play about the life of the Brothers Houdini